Vera Nikolaevna Maslennikova (29 April 1926 – 14 August 2000) was a Russian Mathematician known for her contributions to the theory of partial differential equations.

Early life and war service
Maslennikova was born on 29 April 1926 in the village of Priluki near Vologda in the former USSR. Little is known about her childhood except that she lost her parents when she was only eleven years old. In 1941 she entered the Moscow Textile Engineering School. Maslennikova served in the Great Patriotic War for Russia during the early 1940s in the 413th Independent Antiaircraft Artillery Division in the front-line army. For her service she was awarded the Order of the Patriotic War.

Mathematical career
After the war she enrolled in the Faculty of Mechanics and Mathematics at the University of Moscow.  She graduated with distinction in 1951, having studied under Alexander Gelfond.  Maslennikova then enrolled as a graduate student at the Steklov Institute of Mathematics, advised by Sergei Sobolev.  She obtained her doctorate in 1954 on the topic of "fundamental solutions of initial boundary-value problems for systems of hydrodynamics of rotating fluids with regard to compressibility."  She then continued research at the Steklov Institute, working there for twenty two years.  In 1975 she became the chair of differential equations and functional analysis at the Patrice Lumumba University and continued working there until her death in 2000.

Research
She worked in the field of partial differential equations, the mathematical hydrodynamics of rotating fluids, and in function spaces, having published more than one hundred and forty research papers.

References

PDE theorists
1926 births
2000 deaths
20th-century Russian mathematicians
20th-century women scientists
20th-century women mathematicians